RSS Valour (89) is the second ship of the Victory-class corvette of the Republic of Singapore Navy.

Construction and career
Victory was launched on 10 December 1988 by ST Engineering and was commissioned on 18 August 1990.

Exercise Tandem Thrust 1999 
In 1999, RSS Valour was sent to Guam in preparation for Exercise Tandem Thrust '99.

SIMBEX 2014 
From 22 to 24 May, RSS Valour and RSS Independence participated in the SIMBEX-2014.

Indonesia AirAsia Flight 8501 

In December 2014, Persistence was deployed in the search for Airasia Flight QZ8501 after it crashed into the Java Sea on 28 December 2014; along with the RSN ships Supreme, Valour, and Kallang, MV Swift Rescue, and two Lockheed C-130H Hercules.

Gallery

References

== External links ==

1988 ships
Ships built in Singapore
Victory-class corvettes